Patrick Phelan (1 November 1815 – 31 October 1898) was a farmer, banker and politician in colonial Victoria, a member of the Victorian Legislative Assembly.
 
Born in Raheen, Queen's County, Ireland, Phelan was the son of Patrick Phelan, and his wife Bridget, née Delaney. 
In November 1856, Phelan was elected to the Victorian Legislative Assembly for West Bourke, a position he held until January 1860, his election in 1859 having been declared void.

Phelan was a director of the Colonial Bank of Australia from 1856 to c.1858.

References

 

1815 births
1898 deaths
Members of the Victorian Legislative Assembly
Irish emigrants to colonial Australia
19th-century Australian politicians